Arturo García (born 3 August 1969) is a Mexican former cyclist. He competed in the team pursuit at the 1992 Summer Olympics.

References

External links
 

1969 births
Living people
Mexican male cyclists
Olympic cyclists of Mexico
Cyclists at the 1992 Summer Olympics
Place of birth missing (living people)